Madurai S. Somasundaram, popularly also called Madurai Somu (born S. Paramasivam; 9 February 1919 – 9 December 1989) was a Carnatic music vocalist. He learnt music from Sesha Bhagavatar, Abhirama Sastri and Chittoor Subramanyam Pillai. He started his career by giving a concert in Tiruchendur in 1934.

He was awarded the Padma Shri by the Government of India in 1976, the Sangeet Natak Akademi Award in 1978 and the Sangeetha Kalasikhamani award by The Indian Fine Arts Society in 1983. Annamalai University conferred the Doctor of Law on him Honoris Causa.

He was an ardent devotee of Lord Muruga and is known to take pauses to chant his name.

Early life 
It is interesting how Madurai Somu got his name. Paramasivam was the tenth child of Sachidanandam Pillai and Kamalambal, born on 9 February 1919. Sachidanandam, a Bench Court clerk was the son of Srinivasa Pillai, well-known nagaswara vidwan and the family lived in Swamimalai. Sachidanandam got transferred to Madurai, where they lived on Sembu Kinatru Theru. Paramasivam and his elder brothers were attracted towards the martial arts school run by Muthu Vadyar. They learnt silambam, wrestling, etc.

Paramasivam was also drawn by the bhajans sung by Narayana Konar at the temple. He would sit with a sruti box accompanying the singer. His mother wanted him to learn the nagaswaram but Somu was keen on vocal music so much so that he would stand in neck-deep water and do sadakam.

Paramasivam was initiated into music under Seithur Sundaresa Bhattar, a disciple of Kancheepuram Naina Pillai. Then followed Thevara singing training under Madurai Latchumana Chettiar, a disciple of M.M. Dandapani Desikar and from Sesham Bhagavathar, Abhirami Sasthriar and Madurai Thiruppugazh Mani.

In 1934, Paramasivam rendered some devotional songs in front of the presiding deity Lord Muruga at Thiruchendur. With the blessings of Lord Somasundareswara of Madurai and his own mother Paramasivam became Somasundaram... Somu.

References

External links
All about 'isai perarignar' Madurai Somu
About Madurai Somu
Madurai Somu Artist
Madurai Somu 

Male Carnatic singers
Carnatic singers
Singers from Chennai
1919 births
1989 deaths
Recipients of the Padma Shri in arts
Recipients of the Sangeet Natak Akademi Award
20th-century Indian male classical singers